Rhamphomyia marginata is a species of dance flies, in the fly family Empididae. It is found in Europe, from Great Britain east to Romania and from Fennoscandia south to France, Austria and Hungary.

This species is unusual, though not unique, as it is the females, and not the males that swarm.

References

External links
Fauna Europaea

Rhamphomyia
Asilomorph flies of Europe
Insects described in 1787